Crimthann Mór, son of Fidach , also written Crimthand Mór, was a semi-mythological king of Munster and High King of Ireland of the 4th century. He gained territory in Britain and Gaul, but died poisoned by his sister Mongfind. It is possible that he was also recognized as king of Scotland. This Crimthann is to be distinguished from two previous High Kings of Ireland of the same name, two Kings of Leinster, and another King of Munster, among others. Importantly, he is included in the Baile Chuinn Chétchathaig (summary), and is thus the last High King of Ireland from Munster until Brian Bóruma, over six hundred years later.

In addition to having his reign described by Geoffrey Keating and mentioned in the Annals of the Four Masters, Crimthand Mór mac Fidaig also plays a major role in many stories belonging to the Cycles of the Kings. In these, he is typically succeeded by Niall of the Nine Hostages as High King of Ireland and by Conall Corc as King of Munster, while his sister Mongfind, the first wife of Eochaid Mugmedón, becomes the ancestor of the Three Connachta. Thus this otherwise obscure kindred is central in the mythologies of most of the great medieval Irish dynasties.

According to Geoffrey Keating, Fidheang, daughter of an unnamed king of Connacht, was the wife of Crimthand Mór. She is not mentioned in other sources.

founding

Dind Traduí
According to the Sanas Cormaic, Crimthand Mór mac Fidaig built a great fortress in Cornwall known as Dind Traduí or Dinn Tradui (Dun Tredui/e, fortress of the three ramparts). There appears to be little doubt that it existed, and British archaeologists and linguists have attempted to identify it with a number of sites in Cornwall and in Wales as well, for example, Din Draithou, which is phonetically similar. Din Draithou is widely thought to be the modern Dunster, or the nearby Iron Age hillfort Bat's Castle. It may also be associated with Dind map Letháin, a colonial fortress constructed by the related Uí Liatháin, earlier form Létháin, kingdom of Munster, who is known to have been active in Britain for centuries. They may have retreated to South Wales or Cornwall after being expelled from North Wales by Cunedda, as mentioned in the Historia Brittonum.

In a 1926 paper, Eoin MacNeill discusses the movements of the Uí Liatháin at considerable length, arguing their leadership in the South Irish conquests and the founding of the later dynasty of Brycheiniog, the Welsh genealogies matching Uí Liatháin dynasts in the Irish genealogies. He argues any possible settlement of the Déisi in Wales would have been subordinate until the ousting of the Uí Liatháin by the sons of Cunedda. The founder of Brycheiniog, Brychan, is in all probability the early Uí Liatháin dynast Macc Brocc, while the name Braccan also occurs early in the pedigrees of the Uí Fidgenti and Uí Dedaid, close kindred of the Uí Liatháin. MacNeill further associates this with the sovereignty in Ireland and conquests in Britain of their cousin germane, the monarch Crimthann mac Fidaig.

Crimthand Mór mac Fidaig and the early Uí Liatháin may have belonged to the historical Attacotti (circa 368). Note the correspondence of dates.

Ancestry

As grandchildren of Dáire Cerbba (Cearba, Cearb) in most sources (e.g., Rawlinson B 502), also an ancestor of the Uí Liatháin and Uí Fidgenti, the brother and sister are sometimes regarded as belonging to an early branch of the Eóganachta which later became peripheral or became extinct, although it is more likely that all descendants of Dáire Cerbba belong to a distinct people, possibly the Dáirine, which may be hinted at in an obscure Old Irish poem by Flann mac Lonáin, although in the Banshenchas Mongfind is called "Mongfind of the Érnai" (Érainn), a people in any case related to the Dáirine. A passage in Rawlinson B 502 declares that Dáire Cerbba was born in Mag Breg (Brega), Mide, much of which probably remained Érainn or Dáirine territory at the time of his supposed floruit. Later political genealogies may remove this generation to make the monarch appear closer to the historical Eóganachta, his natural kindred having mostly fallen into obscurity. Byrne reproduces one of these (2001), and does not give his source, probably Laud 610, in which the father of Crimthand Mór is a certain Láre Fidach, son of Ailill Flann Bec. Possibly this is a mistake, or an attempt by the Eóganachta literati, well known for their political fables, to more closely associate the brother and sister with the new Munster dynasty. Mongfind is simply called the daughter of Dáire (Cerbba?), not of Fidach, in the Book of Lismore, and there Dáire's father is called Findchad, while Crimthand Mór is not mentioned at all.

Death

King Crimthann was poisoned by his sister Mongfind in order for her son(s) to win the throne. She died from the act, having taken a sip to lull any suspicions her brother had. While on his travels throughout the kingdom of Munster, the poison took effect, and there he died. A cairn was hastily made for the king.

The cairn is in one of three possible locations: the first being in Glenagross, Sixmilebridge, Co. Clare. The supposed location is known as 'Knock Righ Crimthann' (The hill of the king's death), and the remains of a cairn are still there today. The second location is in Ballycannon, Meelick, Co. Clare (Baile Cónan). Cónan was the supposed first name of the king. This is the location of the cairn, according to the Bard of Thomond, Michael Hogan. There are no known remains of a cairn there today. The third possible location is also in Glenagross: there are three antiquities in a north-south alignment; a standing stone, a ring barrow, and what is described as an 'archaeological complex'.

See also
 Irish nobility
 Kingdoms of Ireland
 List of Celtic tribes
 Iverni
 Attacotti
 Scoti
 Petty kingdom
 Túathal Techtmar

Notes

References

 Best, R.I., Osborn Bergin, M.A. O'Brien and Anne O'Sullivan (eds). The Book of Leinster, formerly Lebar na Núachongbála. 6 vols. Dublin: DIAS, 1954–83. {MS folio 150b} Fland mac Lonain cecinit.
 Bhreathnach, Edel (ed.), The Kingship and Landscape of Tara. Four Courts Press for The Discovery Programme. 2005. Pages 249, 250 & Historical Early Éoganachta, Table 9, pages 356, 357.
 
 
 Charles-Edwards, T.M., Early Christian Ireland. Cambridge. 2000.
 Coogan, Tim Pat, Michael Collins: The Man Who Made Ireland. Palgrave Macmillan. 2002. (pgs. 5–6)
   
 Cross, Tom Peete and Clark Harris Slover (eds.), "The Adventures of the Sons of Eochaid Mugmedon", in Ancient Irish Tales. Henry Holt and Company. 1936. Pages 508–13.
  (Four Courts Press. Revised edition, 1995.)
 Hull, Vernan, "Conall Corc and the Corcu Loígde", in Proceedings of the Modern Languages Association of America 62 (1947): 887–909.
 Hull, Vernan, "The Exile of Conall Corc", in Proceedings of the Modern Languages Association of America 56 (1941): 937–50.
 
 MacKillop, James, A Dictionary of Celtic Mythology. Oxford. 1998.
 
 Meyer, Kuno (ed. and tr.), "The Expulsion of the Dessi", in Y Cymmrodor 14. 1901. pgs. 101-35. (available here)
 Meyer, Kuno (ed.), "The Laud Genealogies and Tribal Histories", in Zeitschrift für Celtische Philologie 8. Halle/Saale, Max Niemeyer. 1912. Pages 291–338.
 Mikhailova, Tatiana and Natalia Nikolaeva, "The denotations of death in Goidelic: to the question of Celtic eschatological conceptions", in Zeitschrift für celtische Philologie. Volume 53, Issue 1 (2003, online 2008): Pages 93–115. 
 Monaghan, Patricia, The Encyclopedia of Celtic Mythology and Folklore. New York: Facts On File. 2004.
 
 Murphy, G. (ed & tr), "On the Dates of Two Sources used in Thurneysen's Heldensage: I. Baile Chuind and the date of Cín Dromma Snechtai", in Ériu (1952): 145–151.
 
 
 Ó Cróinín, Dáibhí (ed.), A New History of Ireland: Prehistoric and Early Ireland, Vol. 1. Oxford University Press. 2005.
 O'Donovan, John (ed. and tr.), Annala Rioghachta Eireann. Annals of the Kingdom of Ireland by the Four Masters, from the Earliest Period to the Year 1616. 7 vols. Royal Irish Academy. Dublin. 1848–51. 2nd edition, 1856.
 O'Grady, Standish H. (ed. and tr.), "Death of Crimthann son of Fidach, and of Eochaidh Muighmedóin's three sons: Brian, Ailill, Fiachra", in Silva Gadelica Williams and Norgate. 1892. Pages 373–8. (also available here)
 O'Grady, Standish H. (ed. and tr.), "The Story of Eochaidh Muighmedóin's Sons", in Silva Gadelica Williams and Norgate. 1892. Pages 368–73.
 O'Hart, John, Irish Pedigrees. 5th edition, 1892.
 O'Keeffe, Eugene (ed. and tr.), Eoganacht Genealogies from the Book of Munster. Cork. 1703. (available here)
 O'Rahilly, Thomas F., Early Irish History and Mythology. Dublin Institute for Advanced Studies. 1946.
 Sproule, David, "Origins of the Éoganachta", in Ériu 35 (1984): pp. 31–37.
 Sproule, David, "Politics and pure narrative in the stories about Corc of Cashel", in Ériu 36 (1985): pp. 11–28.
 Stokes, Whitley (ed. and tr.), "Aided Chrimthaind Maic Fhidaig: The Death of Crimthann mac Fidaig", in Revue Celtique 24. 1903. Pages 172–189.
 Stokes, Whitley (ed. and tr.), "Echtra Mac nEchach Muigmedóin: The Adventures of the Sons of Eochaid Muigmedóin", in Revue Celtique 24. 1903. Pages 190–207.
 
 Thurneysen, R, (ed.), "Baile Chuind Chétchathaig nach der Handschrift von Druim Snechta", in Zu irischen Handschriften und Litteraturdenkmälern (Berlin 1912): 48–52.
 Welch, Robert (ed.) with Bruce Stewart, The Oxford Companion to Irish Literature. Oxford University Press. 1996.

External links
 eDIL: electronic Dictionary of the Irish Language
 Aided Chrimthainn meic Fhidaig 7 Trí Mac Echach Muigmedóin
 Echtra Mac nEchach Muigmedóin
 Conall Corc 7 Ríge Caisil
 Genemain Chuirc meic Luigdech
 Baile Chuinn Cétchathaigh
 Irish Kings
 Viducasses (French)

Legendary High Kings of Ireland
Cycles of the Kings
4th-century Irish monarchs